Nur-Tukhum (Nuur Tükhem) is a rural locality (an ulus) in Selenginsky District, Republic of Buryatia, Russia. The population was 674 as of 2010. There are 30 streets.

Geography 
Nur-Tukhum is located 69 km south of Gusinoozyorsk (the district's administrative centre) by road. Novodesyatnikovo is the nearest rural locality.

References 

Rural localities in Selenginsky District